This is a list of the main career statistics of professional Australian tennis player Ashleigh Barty. She has won 15 singles and 12 doubles titles on the WTA Tour, including three Grand Slam titles in singles and one in doubles, and finished as the year-end world No. 1 in singles in 2019, 2020 and 2021.

Performance timelines

Only main-draw results in WTA Tour, Grand Slam tournaments, Fed Cup/Billie Jean King Cup and Olympic Games are included in win–loss records.

Singles

Doubles
Current after the 2022 Qatar Open.

Mixed doubles

Grand Slam tournament finals
Barty has won three Grand Slam titles in singles and one in doubles.

Singles: 3 (3 titles)

Doubles: 6 (1 title, 5 runner-ups)

Other significant finals

Olympic medal finals

Mixed doubles: 1 (1 bronze medal)

WTA Championships finals

Singles: 1 (1 title)

WTA Elite Trophy

Singles: 1 (1 title)

WTA 1000 finals

Singles: 6 (3 titles, 3 runner-ups)

Doubles: 4 (4 titles)

WTA career finals
Barty has won fifteen singles and twelve doubles titles in the WTA Tour, including at least one on each major surface (hard, clay and grass) in both disciplines.

Singles: 21 (15 titles, 6 runner-ups)

Doubles: 21 (12 titles, 9 runner-ups)

ITF Circuit finals
Barty has won four singles and nine doubles titles on the ITF Women's World Tennis Tour.

Singles: 6 (4 titles, 2 runner–ups)

Doubles: 11 (9 titles, 2 runner–ups)

Junior Grand Slam finals

Singles: 1 (1 title)

Billie Jean King Cup/Fed Cup participation
Barty first represented Australia at the Fed Cup in 2013, and helped her country reach the final in 2019.

Singles: 13 (11–2)

Doubles: 9 (7–2)

WTA Tour career earnings
Correct as of 21 March 2022

Career Grand Slam tournament statistics

Best Grand Slam tournament results details
Grand Slam winners are in boldface, and runner-ups are in italics.

Career Grand Slam tournament seedings
The tournaments won by Barty are in boldface, and advanced into finals by Barty are in italics.

Rivalries

Barty vs. Kvitová
List of all matches

Barty and Petra Kvitová have met ten times, with the head-to-head currently tied 5–5. They first met in 2012 at the French Open where, in her second Grand Slam main draw appearance, Barty was defeated in straight sets. The pair's next clash came more than five years later, in 2017, in the final of Birmingham where Kvitová came back from a set down to claim the title, before replicating a similar victory in the Sydney final in 2019. They met once more two weeks later in the quarterfinals of the Australian Open where Kvitová moved past Barty in straight sets.

Barty then went on to record her first win two months later in the quarterfinals of the Miami Open. She then recorded a further three consecutive victories – in the quarterfinals of the 2019 China Open, in the round-robin stage of the 2019 WTA Finals, and in the quarterfinals of the 2020 Australian Open, the latter two in straight sets. Nonetheless, Kvitová snapped her losing streak in the semifinals of the Qatar Open, recording her fifth win over Barty in the process. This was the final match played by Barty in 2020, as she opted not to play again for the rest of the season due to the COVID-19 pandemic.

Barty and Kvitová resumed their rivalry at the 2021 Madrid Open with Barty prevailing in three sets, thus winning her fifth out of their last six matches.

Barty vs. Sabalenka
List of all matches

Barty and Aryna Sabalenka have met eight times, with the head to head currently tied 4–4. They first met in the first round of the Australian Open in 2018 where Barty needed three sets to defeat Sabalenka. Sabalenka then won the next two encounters later in the year; once in the semifinals of the Wuhan Open and then just a month later in the Round Robin of the WTA Elite Trophy, both in straight sets, however Barty did go on to win the latter tournament.

Barty then avenged those losses the year after at the Fed Cup, defeating her solidly in straight sets. They once again met each other in the semifinals of Wuhan, in a rematch of the previous years semifinal match, with Sabalenka taking the win once again. The next time they met was in the quarterfinals of the Miami Open in 2021 where Barty defeated her in three sets to defend her title. They then met in consecutive clay-court finals in the Stuttgart Open, where Barty prevailed, and the Madrid Open, where Sabalenka took her first WTA 1000 (Mandatory) title.

Record against other players

Record against top 10 players
Barty's record against players who have been ranked in the top 10. Active players are in boldface.

Record against No. 11–20 players 
Barty's record against players who have been ranked world No. 11–20. Active players are in boldface.

 Markéta Vondroušová 4–0
 Daria Saville 4–1
 Barbora Strýcová 3–1
 Anastasia Pavlyuchenkova 3–3
 Petra Martić 2–0
 Elena Rybakina 2–0
 Jennifer Brady 2–1
 Wang Qiang 2–1
 Kirsten Flipkens 1–0
 Kaia Kanepi 1–0
 Ana Konjuh 1–0
 Varvara Lepchenko 1–0
 Elise Mertens 1–0
 Donna Vekić 1–0
 Elena Vesnina 1–0
 Alizé Cornet 1–1
 Coco Gauff 1–1
 Karolína Muchová 1–1
 Peng Shuai 1–1
 Alison Riske 1–2
 Anastasija Sevastova 0–1

No. 1 wins

Top 10 wins
Barty has a 26–22 record against players who were, at the time the match was played, ranked in the top 10.

Longest winning streaks

15 match win streak (2019)

Double bagel matches (6–0, 6–0)

Notes

References

External links
 
 

Tennis career statistics